Natalie Ann Cohen (born January 24, 1989) known by her stage name as Madame Mayhem is an American singer/songwriter and a recording artist from New York.

Early life 
Madame Mayhem began her musical training at the Manhattan School of Music and went on to Frost School of Music at the University of Miami, where she completed a bachelor's degree in music—double majoring in classical opera and musical theatre—in three years.

Music career 
Prior to her debut album release, White Noise (October 2012), she was named a featured artist Clear Channel's iHeartRadio New Discovered and Uncovered Artist chart in February 2011. Her debut album was produced by Grammy Award-winning songwriter Mark Hudson.

Her sophomore album Now You Know (October 2015) and latest album Ready For Me (October 2017) were released under HeadBall Records in the US. Ready For Me was released via Metalville label in the UK and Europe. The album was produced by Corey Lowery. On various singles, she has worked with Ray Luzier of Korn, Billy Sheehan, and Keith Wallen from Breaking Benjamin.

She has performed at The Roxy, The Viper Room, Bowery Ballroom, Knitting Factory, The Cutting Room, the Bluebird Café, and has headlined the VH1’s “THAT METAL SHOW” Christmas Party.

She has also performed for Sunfest 2017, Shiprocked Cruise 2017, Hills of Rock 2018 and Sturgis Buffalo Chip, and toured with DORO, Mushroomhead, Sevendust and more.

Discography

Studio albums

Singles

Music videos

References

Living people
Manhattan School of Music alumni
People from New York City
American women singer-songwriters
1989 births
21st-century American singers
21st-century American women singers
University of Miami Frost School of Music alumni
People from Tenafly, New Jersey
Singer-songwriters from New York (state)